Brayan Andrés Perea Vargas (born 25 February 1993), nicknamed El Coco, is a Colombian professional footballer who plays as a forward for Bulgarian First League club Botev Vratsa.

Club career

Deportivo Cali
Perea began his career playing for the youth ranks of Deportivo Cali. He made his first team debut on 10 September 2011 against Boyacá Chicó. He entered the field in the 77th minute, substituting Cesar Amaya. In 2011, he failed to score a goal, having only made 7 appearances, most of them requiring him to get subbed on. He made his presence more noticeable in 2012, scoring 5 goals but still unable to make a mark in the first team. Due to an impressive campaign with Colombia at the 2013 South American Youth Championship, Perea was guaranteed a spot in the starting eleven almost every game. Perea would score 5 more goals for his home club in 2013 before signing with Serie A club Lazio.

Lazio
On 11 February 2013, it was announced that Perea signed a 5-year deal with Italian side Lazio for a fee of €2.5 million. He was handed the number 34 upon his arrival. He made his debut on 25 September, coming off the bench in a 3–1 win against Catania. Making his Europa League debut, Perea assisted 2 crucial goals in a 3–3 draw against Trabzonspor.

Perea scored his first goal for Le Aquile on 20 October, in a  2–1 loss to Atalanta. He scored his first Europa League goal against Legia in a 0–2 away victory.

Perea spent the following campaigns out on loan, representing Perugia, Troyes AC and CD Lugo.

He was released from his Lazio contract by mutual consent on 28 December 2018.

Independiente Santa Fe
On 27 January 2019 it was confirmed, that Perea had joined Independiente Santa Fe.

Temperley
Argentine club Club Atlético Temperley confirmed on 5 February 2020, that Perea had joined the club on a deal until June 2021.

Botev Vratsa
In early 2022 Perea joined Bulgarian club Botev Vratsa, but only began featuring for the team towards the end of the season. In July 2022, he extended his contract with the team until the summer of 2025.

International career
Perea represented the Colombia U-20 at the 2013 South American Youth Championship. He scored a goal in the tournament against Argentina in the last match of the group stages. Eventually, Colombia won the championship and qualified for the 2013 FIFA U-20 World Cup. Included in the squad to dispute the 2013 FIFA U-20 World Cup, Perea made 4 appearances coming off the bench before Colombia's elimination in the round of 16.

Honours
Colombia U20
South American Youth Championship: 2013

References

External links

1993 births
Living people
Footballers from Cali
Colombian footballers
Association football forwards
Deportivo Cali footballers
S.S. Lazio players
A.C. Perugia Calcio players
ES Troyes AC players
CD Lugo players
Independiente Santa Fe footballers
Club Atlético Temperley footballers
Categoría Primera A players
Ligue 1 players
Championnat National 2 players
Serie A players
Serie B players
Segunda División players
Primera Nacional players
Colombia under-20 international footballers
Colombian expatriate footballers
Colombian expatriate sportspeople in Italy
Colombian expatriate sportspeople in France
Colombian expatriate sportspeople in Spain
Colombian expatriate sportspeople in Argentina
Expatriate footballers in Italy
Expatriate footballers in France
Expatriate footballers in Spain
Expatriate footballers in Argentina